Hombre Invisible is the 5th studio album recorded by Mexican singer-songwriter Ely Guerra, released by her own label Homey Company. The album won a Latin Grammy Award for Best Alternative Music Album in 2010.

Track List 

2009 albums
Spanish-language albums